Legislative elections were held in the Russian Empire in October 1907. They were the second that year after the dissolution of the Second State Duma. The Union of October 17 emerged as the largest party in the third State Duma, winning 125 of the 442 seats.

Results

References

Russia
Russia
Legislative 2
1907 10
Russia